Forest Lake is an outer south-western suburb of the City of Brisbane, Queensland, Australia.

It was the first Master Planned Community within the City of Brisbane.

Geography 

Forest Lake was considered instrumental in the creation of affordable housing within Australia. The development was the first modern-day community to contain small lot product, a first during its time. The master-planned community contained retail, commercial, educational, residential, retirement, and recreational uses. The entire community is linked by an extensive network of pedestrian and cycle paths, which are integrated into the large open-spaced network.

It adjoins the suburbs of Doolandella, Inala, Richlands and Heathwood. It successfully mixes wildlife with residential development.

The Forest Lake Shopping Centre (formerly Forest Lake Village Shopping Centre) is located in Forest Lake.

Villages
The Forest Lake development consists of a series of neighborhoods known as villages. Each village was marketed separately and features an entry statement. These villages are; Woodvale Village, Parkland Village, Homestead Village, Lavender Court, Banksia Village, Pine Village, Lakeside Village, Settlers Village, The Chase, The Woods, Brooklands, Hillbrook Village, The Point, Greentree Pocket, Jetty Walk, Centennial Park, College Park, Creekwood, Creekwood Pocket, Chain of Ponds, Jubilee Crossing, The Cascades, Sanctuary Pocket, Sanctuary Point and The Peninsula. There is also a retirement village called The Terraces and an apartment precinct adjoining the Forest Lake Shopping Centre called Prima on Grand.

The Lake

It has an average depth of 2.6 metres with a 300 to 600 mm around the safety ledge, deepening to 4 metres in the centre. The volume of the lake is 310,000 cubic metres or 269 Olympic sized swimming pools. Surrounding the lake is 3.5 kilometres of pedestrian and cycleways and 8 hectares of adjacent parkland. It was completed and opened in 1994.

History
Forest Lake is situated in the Yugarabul traditional Indigenous Australian country.

A homestead was built by Henry Farley in the late 1870s on a site that is now Homestead Park. It was a substantial building of two-stories and timber construction.  In 1881 the homestead and surrounding property were purchased by Michael (Stumpy) Durack.  The surrounding area became part of "Archerfield Station". In the 1930s it was destroyed by fire, although it has been said that termites caused a great deal of damage to the structure beforehand.

During World War II, there was a command post of the Darra Ordnance Ammunition Depot in the area now Forest Lake. This depot was the largest ordnance depot in the South West Pacific Area. On 31 August 2005 the Richlands-Inala History Group erected an honour stone in Homestead Park, the site of the command post, commemorating the ammunition depot and the American army camps in Inala and Wacol nearby.
In 1990, construction of the master planned community commenced by Delfin Lend Lease. In 1991, Forest Lake was officially launched by the then Premier of Queensland, Wayne Goss. The development lasted until 2006, when the last block of land was sold.

Forest Lake State School opened on 1 January 1994.

Forest Lake College (College Avenue Campus) opened in 1994.

By 1998 the suburb had 10,100 residents.

The master planned community which was created by Delfin Lend Lease was so successful, that in the latter years of the development, up to 40% of new homes sold were purchased by existing residents. (David Keir, Project Director 1996-2000).

Grand Avenue State School opened on 1 January 1999.

Forest Lake State High School opened on 1 January 2001.

As the first Master Planned Community within the City of Brisbane, Forest Lake won numerous awards for its design and Delfin, the developer of Forest Lake, was absorbed into Lend Lease in 2001. Now operating as Delfin Lend Lease, they are developing the adjacent Springfield Lakes Master Planned Community.

Forest Lake College (Alpine Place Campus) opened on 2002.

Mary McConnel School opened on 28 January 2003.

In 2011, Forest Lake College was renamed St John's Anglican College.

In 2011, the lake experienced a blue-green algae (cyanobacterial) bloom, causing some concern to local residents. A local councillor advised people to not enter the water due to the high toxicity levels from the algle bloom.
The median age of the Forest Lake population was 33 years of age, 4 years below the Australian median.  61% of people living in Forest Lake were born in Australia, compared to the national average of 69.8%; the next most common countries of birth were New Zealand 7.9%, England 4.7%, Vietnam 3.1%, India 1.8%, South Africa 1.6%.  73.6% of people spoke only English at home; the next most popular languages were 5% Vietnamese, 1.6% Samoan, 1.4% Sinhalese, 1.3% Mandarin, 1.2% Hindi.

Education 
Forest Lake State School is a government primary (Prep-6) school for boys and girls at Kauri Place. In 2017, the school had an enrolment of 865 students with 69 teachers (59 full-time equivalent) and 38 non-teaching staff (26 full-time equivalent). It includes a special education program.

Grand Avenue State School is a government primary (Prep-6) school for boys and girls at the corner of Centennial Way and Grand Avenue. In 2017, the school had an enrolment of 1225 students with 90 teachers (78 full-time equivalent) and 46 non-teaching staff (30 full-time equivalent). It includes a special education program.

Forest Lake State High School is a government secondary (7-12) school for boys and girls at High Street. In 2017, the school had an enrolment of 1485 students with 121 teachers (117 full-time equivalent) and 57 non-teaching staff (43 full-time equivalent). It includes a special education program.

St John's Anglican College (formerly Forest Lake College) is a private primary (Prep-6) and secondary school (7-12) for boys and girls. It operates two campuses: a primary campus at Alpine Place and a secondary campus at College Avenue. In 2017, the school had an enrolment of 927 students with 80 teachers (69 full-time equivalent) and 63 non-teaching staff (43 full-time equivalent).

Amenities

Forest Lake is serviced by a weekly visit of the Brisbane City Council's mobile library service at the Forest Lake Shopping Centre.

Forest Lake Samoan Church conduct their services on the cornern Corsair Avenue and Inala Avenue in Inala; it is part of the Wesleyan Methodist Church.

Sport
Sports include: Australian rules football, rugby union, netball, baseball, basketball, tennis, swimming, water polo, triathlon, cricket and athletics.

Transport
Transport for Brisbane operates 5 routes that serve stops in Forest Lake:
100: to Brisbane City via Inala, Ipswich Road and South East Busway
101: to Oxley Station via Inala and Richlands Station
118: to Brisbane City via Heathwood, Logan Motorway and Upper Mt Gravatt (Garden City)
460: Heathwood to Brisbane City via Richlands Station and Indooroopilly
463: to Goodna Station via Ellen Grove
534: to Springfield Central Station and to Browns Plains Bus Station

Awards 
The following awards have been received for the project:
 1991 - Royal Australian Planning Institute (QLD): Award for Excellence in Planning
 1991 - Australian Institute of Traffic Planning and Management: Annual Award - Homestead Village Design
 1992 - Queensland Association of Landscape Industries: 1st Prize (Commercial One Landscaping) - Forest Lake Sales and Information Centre
 1994 - Urban Development Institute of Australia: Queensland Award for Excellence - Marketing
 1994 - Urban Development Institute of Australia: Queensland Award for Excellence - Urban Design
 1995 - Case Easrth Awards Queensland: Category Two Award - Forest Lake
 1995 - Case Easrth Awards Queensland: Category Three Award - Forest Lake
 1996 - Urban Development Institute of Australia: Queensland Awards for Excellence - Environment
 1996 - Institute of Engineers (QLD): Engineering Excellence Award - Environment
 1998 - Urban Development Institute of Australia: Queensland Awards for Excellence - Premier Award
 1999 - Urban Development Institute of Australia: National Awards for Excellence - Community Creation
 2000 - Urban Development Institute of Australia: Queensland Awards for Excellence - Community Creation
 2002 - Urban Development Institute of Australia: Queensland Awards for Excellence - Master Planned Community

References

Notes

External links

 

Suburbs of the City of Brisbane
Queensland in World War II